The Filmfare OTT Awards are annual awards that honour artistic and technical excellence in the Hindi-language original programming over-the-top space. The first edition of the awards were held on 19 December 2020. It included films and web series released between August 1, 2019 and July 31 2020.

Award categories 
As of 2020, Filmfare OTT Awards have 32 categories.

Popular awards
Drama series
 Best Series
 Best Director (Series) 
 Best Actor in a Drama Series (Male)
 Best Actor in a Drama Series (Female)
 Best Actor in A Supporting Role in a Drama Series (Male)
 Best Actor in A Supporting Role in a Drama Series (Female)
Comedy Series
 Best Comedy (Series/Specials)
 Best Actor in a Comedy Series (Male)
 Best Actor in a Comedy Series (Female)
 Best Actor in A Supporting Role in a Comedy Series (Male)
 Best Actor in A Supporting Role in a Comedy Series (Female)
Web Original
 Best Film (Web Original)
 Best Actor in a Web Original Film (Male)
 Best Actor in a Web Original Film (Female)
 Best Actor in a Supporting Role in a Web Original Film (Male)
 Best Actor in a Supporting Role in a Web Original Film (Female)
 Best Unscripted (non-fiction) Original (Series/Special)

Critics' Choice Awards
 Best Series (Critics)
 Best Director (Critics)
 Best Actor in a Drama Series (Critics) 
 Best Actress in a Drama Series (Critics) 
 Best Actor in a Comedy Series (Critics) 
 Best Actress in a Comedy Series (Critics)

Writing Awards
 Best Screenplay (Series)
 Best Dialogue
 Best Original Story (Series)

Music Awards
 Best Background Music (Series)
 Best Original Soundtrack (Series)

Technical awards
 Best Cinematography (Series)
 Best Art-Direction (Series)
 Best Editing (Series)
 Best Costume Design (Series)

In 2021 another award was introduced:
 Best VFX

Award ceremonies

2020

The 2020 edition of OTT awards were held on 19 December 2020 in Mumbai. It considered series released between 1 August 1, 2019 and 31 July 2020, for the awards.

2021

The 2021 edition of awards show was held on 9 December 2021 in Mumbai. Nominations were announced by Filmfare on 2 December 2021.

2022

The 2022 edition of awards show was held on 21 December 2022 in Mumbai. Nominations were announced by Filmfare on 17 December 2022.

Popular awards

Drama Series

Comedy Series

Web Originals

Critics' Choice awards

Writing awards

Technical awards

Best Music awards

See also
 Filmfare Awards
 Over-the-top media service in India

References

External links
 

Indian awards
Award ceremonies in India
OTT